Elmar is a male given name.

People named Elmar include:
Elmar Altvater (born 1938), German political scientist
Elmar Bakhshiev (born 1980), Azerbaijani footballer
Elmar Bolowich (born 1954), American soccer coach
Elmar Borrmann (born 1957), German fencer
Elmar Brandt (born 1971), German comedian
Elmar Brok (born 1946), German politician
Elmar Díaz Solórzano (born 1969), Mexican politician
Elmar Frings (1939–2002), German modern pentathlete
Elmar Gasanov (born 1983), Ukrainian pianist
Elmar Gasimov (born 1988), Azerbaijani judoka
Elmar Geirsson (born 1948), Icelandic footballer
Elmar Hess (born 1966), German artist
Elmar Hörig (born 1949), German journalist
Elmar Huseynov (1967–2005), Azerbaijani journalist
Elmar Järvesoo (1909–1994),  Estonian agricultural scientist and politician
Elmar Kaljot (1901–1969), Estonian footballer
Elmar Kits (1913–1972), Estonian painter
Elmar Kivistik (1905–1973), Estonian sport shooter
Elmar Klos (1910–1993), Czech film director
Elmar Kraushaar (born 1950), German journalist and author
Elmar Korko (1908–1941), Estonian rower
Elmar Lampson (born 1952), German composer
Elmar Ledergerber (born 1944), German politician
Elmar Leppik (1878–1978), Estonian mycologist
Elmar Lichtenegger (born 1974), Austrian hurdler
Elmar Liitmaa (born 1970), Estonian guitarist and songwriter
Elmar Lipping (1906–1994), Estonian politician
Elmar Lohk (1901–1963), Estonian architect
Elmar Lubbe, South African rugby league player
Elmar Mäder (born 1963), Swiss military commander
Elmar Magerramov (born 1958), Azerbaijani chess player
Elmar Mammadyarov (born 1960), Azerbaijani politician and diplomat
Elmar Muuk (1901–1941), Estonian linguist
Elmar Oliveira (born 1950), American violinist
Elmar Peintner (born 1954), Austrian artist
Elmar Pieroth (born 1934), German politician
Elmar Rähn (1904–1996), Estonian track and field athlete
Elmar Rajsur, Azerbaijani-Russian singer
Elmar Reimann (1893–1963), Estonian long-distance runner
Elmar Rojas (born 1942), Guatemalan painter
Elmar Saar (1908–1981), Estonian footballer and coach 
Elmar Salulaht (1910–1974), Estonian opera singer and actor
Elmar Schmid (born 1947), Swiss clarinetist
Elmar Seebold (born 1934), German philologist
Elmar Tampõld (1920–2013), Estonian-Canadian architect
Elmar Tepp (1913–1943), Estonian footballer 
Elmar Truu (born 1942), Estonian politician and sports pedagogue
Elmar Valiyev (born 1960), Azerbaijani politician
Elmar Wepper (born 1944), German actor
Theódór Elmar Bjarnason (born 1987), Icelandic footballer

References

Azerbaijani masculine given names
Estonian masculine given names
German masculine given names
Icelandic masculine given names